The first Corsican Constitution was drawn up in 1755 for the short-lived Corsican Republic independent from Genoa beginning in 1755, and remained in force until the annexation of Corsica by France in 1769. It was written in Tuscan Italian, the language of elite culture and people in Corsica at the time.

It was drafted by Pasquale Paoli, and inspired by Jean-Jacques Rousseau, who, commissioned by the Corsicans wrote "Projet de constitution pour la Corse," in 1763.

The second Corsican Constitution was drawn up in 1794 for the short-lived (1794–96) Anglo-Corsican Kingdom and introduced suffrage for all property owners. It was also considered a highly democratic constitution for its time.

Linda Colley credits Paoli as writing the first ever written constitution of a nation state.

Notes

External links

 Text of constitution (in French)
 Second Corsican constitution (1794)

1755 in law
1794 in law
Democracy
Constitution
Constitutions of former countries
1755 documents
1794 documents